Gowmazi Kowsar (also Romanized as Gowmāzī Kows̄ar) is a village in Kambel-e Soleyman Rural District, in the Central District of Chabahar County, Sistan and Baluchestan Province, Iran. At the 2006 census, its population was 47, in 7 families.

References 

Populated places in Chabahar County